Bugembe is a town in Jinja District in the Eastern Region of Uganda. It is the seat of the Kingdom of Busoga, one of the four constitutional in Uganda, which is coterminous with the Busoga sub-region.

Location
The town is located on the highway between Jinja and Iganga. The coordinates of Bugembe are:0°28'03.0"N, 33°14'29.0"E (Latitude:0.467500; Longitude:33.241389).

Population
In 2002, the national census counted the town's population as 26,268. In 2010, the Uganda Bureau of Statistics estimated the population at 32,200. In 2011, the bureau estimated the mid-year population at 33,100.

Points of interest
The following points of interest lie within the town limits or near the edges of town:

 offices of Bugembe Town Council
 headquarters of the Kingdom of Busoga
 Bugembe Police Barracks
 Nakanyangi Primary School
 Jinja Lake View Primary School
 Nakanyonyi Girls' Secondary School
 St. Thaddeus Secondary School
 Bugembe central market
 Bugembe Health Center
 St. Florence Secondary School
 Vic View High School
 Wanyange Girls' Secondary School

See also
 Kyabazinga

References

Jinja District
Busoga
Populated places in Eastern Region, Uganda
Cities in the Great Rift Valley